Grusin is a surname. Notable people with the surname include:

Dave Grusin (born 1934), American composer, arranger, producer, and pianist
Don Grusin (born 1941), American jazz keyboardist, composer, and record producer
Richard Grusin (born 1953), American new media scholar and author

See also
Grusin Rosen Production or GRP Records, a jazz record label founded by Dave Grusin and Larry Rosen in 1978
Grushin (surname)